The 2012–13 FC Admira Wacker Mödling season is the 100th season in club history. In the 2011–12 Bundesliga, Admira qualified for the Second qualifying round of the 2012–13 UEFA Europa League.

Review and events

Matches

Legend

Bundesliga

League results and fixtures

League table

Overall league table

Summary table

ÖFB-Cup

UEFA Europa League

Qualifying rounds

Second qualifying round

Third qualifying round

Squad and statistics

|}

Sources

Admira Wacker Modling
Admira Wacker Modling
FC Admira Wacker Mödling seasons